is a Japanese footballer. He currently plays for Kyoto Sanga FC.

Club team career statistics
Updated to 23 February 2018.

References

External links 
Profile at Tokyo Verdy 
Profile at FC Gifu 

1990 births
Living people
Osaka Gakuin University alumni
Association football people from Mie Prefecture
Japanese footballers
J2 League players
J3 League players
FC Gifu players
Tokyo Verdy players
Kataller Toyama players
Kyoto Sanga FC players
Association football goalkeepers